Merril Anthony (16 November 1909 – 18 May 1967) was a Guyanese cricketer. He played in one first-class match for British Guiana in 1929/30.

See also
 List of Guyanese representative cricketers

References

External links
 

1909 births
1967 deaths
Guyanese cricketers
Guyana cricketers